Waimea-Sounds was a fully rural parliamentary electorate in the Marlborough and Nelson Regions of New Zealand, from 1893 to 1896. During its one parliamentary term of existence, the Waimea-Sounds electorate was represented by one Member of Parliament.

Population centres
In the 1892 electoral redistribution, population shift to the North Island required the transfer of one seat from the South Island to the north. The resulting ripple effect saw every electorate established in 1890 have its boundaries altered, and many new electorates were created, including Waimea-Sounds. The electorate superseded the Waimea-Picton electorate, but lost the town of Picton to the  electorate, and gained the town of Motueka from the  electorate. Havelock was also located in the Waimea-Sounds electorate. The Waimea-Sounds electorate was classed as fully rural, and the full 28% of the country quota applied.

The Waimea-Sounds electorate was abolished after one parliamentary term in the 1896 electoral redistribution.

History
The Waimea-Sounds electorate was represented by one Member of Parliament, Charles Houghton Mills.

Election results
The Waimea-Sounds electorate was represented by one Member of Parliament.

Key

Notes

References

Historical electorates of New Zealand
Marlborough Region
1893 establishments in New Zealand
1896 disestablishments in New Zealand